Fay Muller (born 4 November 1933) is a former international tennis player from Australia. She competed in the Australian Championships nine times, from 1952 to 1963. At the 1956 Wimbledon Championships she partnered with Daphne Seeney to reach the final of the doubles event. In 1957 she won the mixed doubles title with Malcolm Anderson at the Australian Championships and reached the women's doubles final with Mary Bevis Hawton.

Muller married twice. Her first marriage to Arden Arthur Robinson took place on 27 February 1960 in Brisbane. Her second marriage was to Robert William Colthorpe on 27 February 1971, also in Brisbane. Muller was honored by the Brisbane City Council in May 2016 by having a Tennis Rebound Wall named after her at the site of the old Milton Tennis Courts, now known as Frew Park.

Grand Slam tournament finals

Doubles (2 runners-up)

Mixed doubles (1 title)

References 

1933 births
Living people
Australian female tennis players
Grand Slam (tennis) champions in mixed doubles
Tennis people from Queensland
Australian Championships (tennis) junior champions
Australian Championships (tennis) champions